The electoral district of Bayswater is one of the electoral districts of Victoria, Australia, for the Victorian Legislative Assembly. It lies within the Eastern Metropolitan Region of the upper house, the Legislative Council.

Bayswater was created as a notionally marginal Labor seat in a redistribution for the 1992 state election. It replaced the abolished electorate of Ringwood, which had been held by Labor MP and Kirner government Minister for Community Services Kay Setches since 1982. The area had been traditionally Liberal prior to Setches' election; she had been the first Labor member to hold Ringwood. Setches contested Bayswater at the election, but was resoundingly defeated by Liberal candidate and personnel consultant Gordon Ashley in the Liberal landslide victory that year, one of several ministers to lose their seats.

Ashley was easily re-elected at the 1996 election and 1999 election, but was unexpectedly defeated by Labor candidate Peter Lockwood in the Labor landslide victory at the 2002 election. Lockwood only lasted one term before being defeated by Liberal Heidi Victoria in 2006. Victoria served as Minister for the Arts, Minister for Women's Affairs and Minister for Consumer Affairs in the Napthine Ministry from 2013 to 2014. The seat was won back by Labor somewhat unexpectedly in the 2018 Victorian state election, with Jackson Taylor serving as the current Labor MP for the district.

Members for Bayswater

Election results

Graphical summary

External links
 Electorate profile: Bayswater District, Victorian Electoral Commission

References

1992 establishments in Australia
Electoral districts of Victoria (Australia)
City of Knox
Electoral districts and divisions of Greater Melbourne